Husein Balić (born 15 February 1996) is an Austrian professional footballer who plays as a winger for Austrian Bundesliga club LASK and the Austria national team.

Club career
He made his Austrian Football Bundesliga debut for SKN St. Pölten on 23 September 2017 in a game against FC Admira Wacker Mödling.

LASK
On 23 December 2019 LASK confirmed, that Balić had joined the club on a contract until the summer 2024.

International career
Born in Austria, Balić is of Bosnian descent and was born to a Bosnian Muslim family. He made his debut for Austria national football team on 11 November 2020 in a friendly game against Luxembourg. He substituted Valentino Lazaro in the 58th minute.

Career statistics

References

External links
 
 
 

1996 births
Living people
People from Steyr
Austrian footballers
Austria under-21 international footballers
Austria international footballers
Austrian people of Bosnia and Herzegovina descent
SK Vorwärts Steyr players
SKN St. Pölten players
LASK players
Austrian Football Bundesliga players
Austrian Regionalliga players
Association football midfielders
Footballers from Upper Austria